Hmeida Ould Ahmed Taleb (born 1968) is a Mauritanian political figure, currently serving in the government as Minister of Higher Education and Scientific Research.

Ahmed Taleb was born in Tintane. He became First Secretary to the Mauritanian Embassy in Libya in 2000 before becoming First Secretary to the Mauritanian Embassy in Egypt in 2001. In 2007 he became First Secretary and Chargé d'affaires of the Mauritanian Embassy in Egypt. Ahmed Taleb was appointed as Minister of Higher Education and Scientific Research in July 2008.

References

1968 births
Living people
Mauritanian diplomats
Government ministers of Mauritania
People from Hodh El Gharbi Region